The 2022–23 Hong Kong Second Division League is the 9th season of the Hong Kong Second Division since it became the third-tier football league in Hong Kong in 2014–15. The season began on 9 October 2022.

Teams

Changes from last season

From Second Division

Promoted to First Division
 Kowloon City
 Kwai Tsing

To Second Division

Promoted from Third Division
 3 Sing
 Kowloon Cricket Club
 Sai Kung
 Wing Go

League table

References

Hong Kong Second Division League seasons
2021–22 in Hong Kong football
2022–23 in Hong Kong football
2022–23 in Asian third tier association football leagues
Association football events curtailed and voided due to the COVID-19 pandemic